Ipswich Road may refer to:

Ipswich Road, Brisbane, Australia
Ipswich Road, Colchester, England